Formica Leo, named for its similar shape to the pitfall built by the antlion, is a small volcanic crater of the Piton de la Fournaise (French for "Peak of the Furnace"), the active volcano on the eastern side of Réunion island (a French department) in the Indian Ocean.  It is located at the bottom of the caldera called Enclos Fouqué, just beneath the mountain pass Pas de Bellecombe.

Geography 

Volcanic craters
Hotspot volcanoes
Parasitic cones
Volcanoes of Réunion
Mountains of Réunion